Kyiv-Basket is the Ukrainian basketball club based in Kyiv. Originally founded in 1992 and refounded in 2017, the team plays in the Ukrainian Basketball SuperLeague (UBL). The re-established club made its debut in the Ukrainian Basketball SuperLeague in the 2018–19 season. It replaced the previous club from Kyiv in the UBL, Budivelnyk.

History
The club was founded in 1992 as Maccabi-Dandy by politician and businessman Mykhailo Brodskyy. The team won several trophies in Ukraine. In 1998, the team ceased to exist because of the financial problems.

In November 2017, the club had a revival as a new team was established. The new logo of the team, featuring a bee, was revealed while it was announced that the club would have a women's team and two men's team in the 2017–18 season. The new home arena of the team was the Meridian Sports Complex.

In the 2018–19 season, Kyiv-Basket finished as runners-up as it was defeated by Khimik in the finals, 0–3. Currently the team sits in second place in the UBL and 1st in the second stage of Fiba Europe Cup

Honors

Arenas

Players

Current roster

Season by season

References

External links
Official website (in Ukrainian)

 
Basketball teams in Ukraine
Sport in Kyiv
Basketball teams established in 1992
1992 establishments in Ukraine
Basketball teams disestablished in 1998
1998 disestablishments in Ukraine
Basketball teams established in 2017
2017 establishments in Ukraine